Bolt is a  social media company.

History 
Bolt was founded in 2018  by Jamal Hassim and Christel Quek with its headquarters located in London, United Kingdom.

In 2019, Bolt launched its flagship product, Bolt+, during the 2019 Cricket World Cup. Bolt+ streamed coverage of the Cricket World Cup all through the period of the game. Bolt has also streamed coverage of the 2019 Rugby World Cup  and announced coverage of the 2020 Summer Olympics in Tokyo, which was cancelled due to the COVID-19 pandemic.

In the same 2019, Bolt  launched BoltX, a self-custody wallet for digital assets. It also listed a utility-based digital token, the Bolt token, on Bitmax (now AscendEx) as well as on KuCoin.

In 2022, Bolt announced  that it was engaged in a reverse takeover corporate transaction into the main market of the London Stock Exchange.

Strategic partnerships 
In 2018, Bolt launched an educational content partnership with the Blockchain Association of Kenya to offer a Blockchain education in the region.

In 2020, Bolt announced a flagship partnership with Hisense Group, and launched the Bolt+ Smart TV application on Hisense smart TVs in South Africa and across the African continent. By the end of 2020, the geographic coverage expanded to include all Hisense smart TVs in the Middle East, Asia Pacific and Australia.

In the same 2020, Bolt announced a strategic partnership with Dugout Worldwide  (later acquired by OneFootball). Bolt also established content partnerships with France 24  and Deutsche Welle. Bolt equally launched a streaming partnership with British-South African broadcasting and conservation company WildEarth.

In 2022, Bolt launched a flagship partnership with Binance, and also co-launched Bolt+ as a new web3-enabled live entertainment and social experience.

References

External links
 Official website
 Bolt+ website
 BoltX website

British companies established in 2018
Companies based in London
Social media companies